The Beuvry Communal Cemetery Extension (also known as the Beuvry Communal Commonwealth War Graves Commission Cemetery Extension) is a cemetery located in the Pas-de-Calais region of France. It contains mostly British and Commonwealth soldiers killed near the village of Beuvry in the First and Second World Wars. The cemetery is managed by the Commonwealth War Graves Commission.

Location 
The extension is located to the left of the Beuvry Communal Cemetery in Beuvry, approximately 3 kilometers east of the town of Bethune, France.

Fighting around Beuvry 

Beuvry village was occupied during the First World War by a variety of British Royal Engineers, supply, and artillery units, remaining in British control even in the German spring offensive of 1918.

Establishment of the Extension

History 
The cemetery extension was begun in March 1916 and was used until October 1918. After the end of World War I, cemeteries from battlefields North and East of Bethune were reburied in the extension. A Cross of Sacrifice was put in the middle of the cemetery. The extension was designed by Captain Wilfred Clement Von Berg.

Statistics 
The extension covers an area of 86 square meters and is surrounded by a rubble wall. There are a total of 206 World War I Commonwealth burials, of which 32 are unidentified, onsite. There is also 1 French burial from WWI located in the extension. 18 Commonwealth soldiers from World War II are buried in the extension.

References 

Military cemeteries